Thuldai (translation: Big Brother) is a 1999 Nepali film directed by Dayaram Dahal and features music by Shambhujeet Baskota. The film has a cast that includes Jal Shah, Shiv Shrestha, Niruta Singh, and Sunil Thapa.

Cast
 Shiv Shrestha
 Jal Shah
 Niruta Singh
 Sunil Thapa
 Narendra Thapa
 Laxmi Giri
 Roshan Shrestha
 Dayaram Dahal

See also

Cinema of Nepal
List of Nepalese films

External links
 
 

1999 films
Nepali-language films
1999 drama films
Nepalese drama films

ne:झरना बज्राचार्य